Hanyin County is a county in the south of Shaanxi province, China. It is under the administration of the prefecture-level city of Ankang.

Hanyin was established as early as the Qin dynasty and then known as Xicheng County. In 757 AD it became Hanyin.

Administrative divisions
As 2019, Hanyin County is divided to 10 towns.
Towns

Climate

Transportation
Hanying is served by the Yangpingguan–Ankang Railway. Major highways include China National Highway 316 as well as the G7011 Shiyan–Tianshui Expressway.

References

External links

County-level divisions of Shaanxi
Ankang